American Dad! twentieth season is scheduled to premiere on TBS on March 27, 2023. The season will feature guest appearances from Pete Davidson, Anjelica Houston, Jason Alexander, Jaleel White, Chris Sullivan, Ann Dowd, Amy Sedaris, Alan Tudyk, Alyson Hannigan and Simon Helberg. it will include the series' 350th episode.

Production
On December 16, 2021, TBS renewed American Dad for seasons 20 and 21, following the end of the show's eighteenth season.

Release
The series' twentieth season was announced on March 6, 2023, with a special trailer with the tagline "20 Seasons, And Still Proud", showcasing moments from the upcoming season. with episodes coming to Hulu later this year. the season will premiere on March 27, 2023.

Episodes

References

2023 American television seasons